Lead Pipe is the second studio album by American rapper Grand Daddy I.U. from Queens, New York. It was released on June 21, 1994 through Cold Chillin'/Epic Street. The entire album (with the exception of "Blast a New Asshole") was produced by Grand Daddy I.U. and Kay Cee.

Despite being released on a major label, the album was a commercial failure, only reaching number 88 on the Billboard Top R&B/Hip-Hop Albums. Following the album, Grand Daddy I.U. appeared on Big L's 1995 album, Lifestylez ov da Poor & Dangerous and then went on a 12-year hiatus before returning in 2007 with his third studio album, Stick to the Script.

Track listing

Personnel
Ayyub Cave – main artist, producer (tracks: 1-7, 9-16), mixing
Anthony PapaMichael – bass, keyboards, strings, engineering, mixing
Anton Pukshansky – bass, piano
Richard Bush – keyboards
Brett Miles – horns
Vikki – backing vocals
Earlando Arrington "Early B" Neil – backing vocals
Kay Cee – scratches, producer (tracks: 1-7, 9-16), arranger, mixing
Big Snow – producer (track 8)
Robert Power – mixing
Loren Wilson Hill – re-mixing (track 16)
Wendell "The Grinch" Hanes – re-mixing (track 16)
Tyrone "Fly Ty" Williams – executive producer
Leonard Fichtelberg – executive producer

Charts

References

External links

1994 albums
Grand Daddy I.U. albums
Cold Chillin' Records albums